Z-DOS is a discontinued OEM version of Microsoft's MS-DOS specifically adapted to run on the hardware of the Zenith Z-100 personal computer.

Overview
The Z-100 used a 8086-family microprocessor, (the Intel 8088), but otherwise had a completely different internal architecture from the IBM PC.

At the time Microsoft's MS-DOS wasn't specifically geared to any specific hardware platform, but could be tailored to run on most any system as long as it used a 8086-compatible microprocessor, a situation completely like with the popular CP/M systems of the time, which typically used a 8080-compatible (8080, 8085 and Z80 among others) microprocessor. In order to achieve this, MS-DOS, like CP/M, relied on a platform-specific (DOS-)BIOS, which had to be written for the target machine, so that the hardware-independent DOS kernel could run on it. Beside IBM's OEM version of MS-DOS released as PC DOS there were dozens of other OEM versions of MS-DOS geared to a specific non-IBM-compatible OEM hardware—among them Zenith's Z-DOS. Only later, when almost 100% IBM-compatible clones became the norm, "MS-DOS" became the generic version which could run on most of them. This generic version of MS-DOS, however, could not run on the older non-IBM-compatible machines like the Z-100.

See also
 DOS API
 Towns OS – an MS-DOS adaptation by Fujitsu for FM Towns
 List of DOS commands
 Timeline of DOS operating systems

References

Disk operating systems
Discontinued Microsoft operating systems
DOS variants
Floppy disk-based operating systems